Vaughanites leptus is an extinct species of marine gastropod mollusk in the family Pyramimitridae.

Description
Length 17.9 mm.; diameter 4.7 mm. (holotype, apex broken).

(Original description) the outline, nucleus, and aperture as described under the genus. The sculpture consists of an open lattice-work of spiral and axial cords. Five spirals, of which the third from the suture is strongest, lie on penultimate whorl. Spirals overriding axials, but slightly swollen at intersections. Axials bent at strong spiral marking apex of anal notch.

Distribution
Fossils of this marine species have been found in Pliocene strata of  Jamaica (age range:3.6 to 2.588 Ma)

References

 J. A. Todd. 2001. Systematic list of gastropods in the Panama Paleontology Project collections

External links
 Fossilworks: Vaughanites leptus

leptus
Gastropods described in 1928